Orgoroso is a village or populated centre in the Paysandú Department of western Uruguay.

Geography
The railroad track that joins the city of Paysandú with Paso de los Toros passes through the south limits of the village.

Population
In 2011 Orgoroso had a population of 583.
 
Source: Instituto Nacional de Estadística de Uruguay

References

External links
INE map of Orgoroso

Populated places in the Paysandú Department